Lenny Rubin (born 1 February 1996) is a Swiss handball player for HSG Wetzlar and the Swiss national team.

He represented Switzerland at the 2020 European Men's Handball Championship.

References

External links

1996 births
Living people
Swiss male handball players
Expatriate handball players
Swiss expatriate sportspeople in Germany
HSG Wetzlar players
Handball-Bundesliga players